The year 2005 is the 11th year in the history of Fighting Network Rings, a mixed martial arts promotion based in Japan. In 2005 Fighting Network Rings held 6 events beginning with, Rings: Bushido Ireland.

Events list

Rings: Bushido Ireland

Rings: Bushido Ireland was an event held on March 12, 2005 in Ireland.

Results

Rings Holland: Armed and Dangerous

Rings Holland: Armed and Dangerous was an event held on April 3, 2005 at the Vechtsebanen Sport Hall in Utrecht, Netherlands.

Results

Rings Holland: Fighting Nordin Memorial Fight Gala

Rings Holland: Fighting Nordin Memorial Fight Gala was an event held on May 21, 2005 at the Sports Hall in Purmerend, Netherlands.

Results

Rings Russia: CIS vs. The World

Rings Russia: CIS vs. The World was an event held on August 20, 2005 at the Rings Sports Centrum in Yekaterinburg, Sverdlovsk Oblast, Russia.

Results

Rings Ireland: Reborn

Rings Ireland: Reborn was an event held on October 15, 2005 in Ireland.

Results

Rings Holland: Men of Honor

Rings Holland: Men of Honor was an event held on December 11, 2005 in Utrecht, Holland.

Results

See also 
 Fighting Network Rings
 List of Fighting Network Rings events

References

Fighting Network Rings events
2005 in mixed martial arts